Jas Gawronski (born 7 February 1936) is an Italian journalist and politician. He was a member of the European Parliament for North-West with Forza Italia, member of the Bureau of the European People's Party, and sits on the European Parliament's Committee on Foreign Affairs.

Biography 
Gawronski, who speaks Polish fluently, was born in Vienna, Austria, the son of a Polish ambassador, Jan Gawroński, and the Italian writer Luciana Frassati. He was correspondent for RAI (Italian State television) from New York, Paris, Moscow and Warsaw, and later hosted some political shows for Silvio Berlusconi's Mediaset network. He collaborated with the newspapers Il Giorno and La Stampa. From 1981 to 1994 he was member of the European Parliament for the Italian Republican Party. He later switched to Berlusconi's Forza Italia, for which he was elected to the Italian Senate in 1996–99.

Gawronski is a substitute for the Committee on International Trade, a member of the Delegation for relations with the countries of Southeast Asia and the Association of Southeast Asian Nations (ASEAN) and a substitute for the Delegation for relations with the Korean Peninsula.

External links
Files about his parliamentary activities (in Italian): XIII legislature
 
 

1936 births
Living people
Italian journalists
Italian Republican Party politicians
Forza Italia politicians
MEPs for Italy 2004–2009
Forza Italia MEPs
MEPs for Italy 1999–2004
Commanders of the Order of Merit of the Republic of Poland
Austrian people of Polish descent
Austrian people of Italian descent
Austrian emigrants to Poland
Austrian emigrants to Italy
Polish emigrants to Italy
Polish people of Italian descent